"Richard II" is first episode of the first series of the British television series The Hollow Crown, based on William Shakespeare's play of the same name. "Richard II" was directed by Rupert Goold, who adapted the screenplay with Ben Power. Ben Whishaw stars as the titular Richard II of England. It was first broadcast on 30 June 2012 on BBC Two.

Whishaw's performance earned him the 2013 British Academy Television Award (BAFTA) for Leading Actor. The program was also nominated for the Best Single Drama award.

Cast
 Ben Whishaw as Richard II of England
 Rory Kinnear as Henry Bolingbroke
 Patrick Stewart as John of Gaunt, Duke of Lancaster
 David Suchet as the Edmund of Langley, Duke of York
 David Morrissey as Henry Percy, Earl of Northumberland
 Tom Hughes as Aumerle
 James Purefoy as Thomas de Mowbray, Duke of Norfolk
 Clémence Poésy as the Queen (a combination of Isabella of Valois and Anne of Bohemia)
 Lindsay Duncan as the Duchess of York
 Ferdinand Kingsley as Bushy
 Samuel Roukin as Bagot
 Harry Hadden-Paton as Green
 Tom Goodman-Hill as Sir Stephen Scroop
 Adrian Schiller as Lord Willoughby
 Peter de Jersey as Lord Ross
 Finbar Lynch as Lord Marshall
 Lucian Msamati as the Bishop of Carlisle
 Richard Bremmer as the Abbot of Westminster
 Rhodri Miles as the Welsh Captain
 David Bradley as the Gardener
 Simon Trinder as the Gardener's Assistant
 Isabella Laughland as the Queen's Lady
 Daniel Boyd as the Groom

Production

The BBC scheduled the screening of Shakespeare's history plays as part of 2012's Cultural Olympiad, a celebration of British culture coinciding with the 2012 Summer Olympics. Sam Mendes signed up as executive producer to adapt all four of Shakespeare's tetralogy (Richard II, Henry IV, Part 1, Henry IV, Part 2 and Henry V) in September 2010. He is joined as executive producer by Pippa Harris (both representing Neal Street Productions), Gareth Neame (NBCUniversal), and Ben Stephenson (BBC).

"Richard II" was shot entirely on location, including at St David's Cathedral, Pembroke Castle and Packwood House. It completed filming in July 2011. One of the characters in Richard II, the Duchess of Gloucester, is absent from this adaptation.

References

External links
 
 

2012 British television episodes
Works based on Richard II (play)
The Hollow Crown (TV series)